Jeannie may refer to:
 Jeannie (given name), a given name and a list of people with the name
 Jeannie (I Dream of Jeannie), a main character of I Dream of Jeannie
 Jeannie (TV series), an animated series based on I Dream of Jeannie
 "Jeannie", the theme song of I Dream of Jeannie
 Jeannie (film), a 1941 British film by Harold French
 Jeannie River, Queensland, Australia

See also
 Genie (disambiguation)
 Jeanie, a given name
 Jeanny, a given name